Andriy Cherepko (born 17 January 1997) is a Ukrainian football goalkeeper.

Career
Cherepko is a product of the Uzhhorod Youth Sportive School System. In 2015 after playing in the amateur level, he signed a contract with FC Hoverla, but played only in the FC Hoverla Uzhhorod reserves. In the main-team squad Cherepko made his debut as a substitute in the match against FC Volyn Lutsk on 14 May 2016 in the Ukrainian Premier League.

References

External links
Profile at UAF Official Site (Ukr)

1997 births
Living people
Ukrainian footballers
FC Hoverla Uzhhorod players
Ukrainian Premier League players
Kisvárda FC players
FC Mynai players
Ukrainian expatriate footballers
Expatriate footballers in Hungary
Ukrainian expatriate sportspeople in Hungary
Association football goalkeepers
MFA Mukachevo players
Sportspeople from Zakarpattia Oblast